John Shearer may refer to:
 John Bunyan Shearer (1832–1919), president of Davidson College
 John Shearer (engineer) (1845–1932), Australian engineer
 Jock Shearer (1917–1979), Scottish professional footballer
 Jack Shearer (priest) (1926–2001), Church of Ireland Dean of Belfast
 John Shearer (photographer) (1947–2019), American photographer
 John D. Shearer (born 1980), American photographer

See also
 John Shearer Fletcher (1888–1934), New Zealand politician